Syed Sis bin Syed Abdul Rahman is a Malaysian politician. He was the Member of Johor State Legislative Assembly for Tanjung Surat from 2013 to 2018.

Election result

Honours 
  :
  Knight Companion of the Order of Loyalty to Negeri Sembilan (DSNS) – Dato’ (2001)

References 

United Malays National Organisation politicians
Members of the Johor State Legislative Assembly
Malaysian people of Malay descent
Living people
Year of birth missing (living people)